Independent Theatre (IT) is an Australian theatre company based in Adelaide, South Australia. It has strong links to American theatre and culture, frequently producing plays by American playwrights, but also produces classical and contemporary theatre, as well as adaptations from novels.

Founded in 1983 by continuing artistic director Rob Croser, the company was the first non-professional company to be invited to perform in the Space Theatre at the Adelaide Festival Centre. Croser is assisted by David Roach, who has acted in several productions as well as designing sets for many. Independent Theatre has had a relationship with American playwright John Logan, who is a benefactor, since the 1990s, and has produced several of his plays. Logan's Peter and Alice was the company's hundredth production, staged in 2014. The company continues to produce three or four plays each year, usually staged at the Goodwood Institute or the Space.

History
Independent Theatre (IT) was founded in 1983 by Rob Croser  (a lawyer in youth court), David Roach, Allen Munn, Pattie Atherton, and others. Croser became inaugural artistic director. The first performances were staged in 1984, and since then until at least 2022 the company has produced three or four plays every year, all but two directed by Croser.

Croser has collaborated with international theatre professionals, including Elaine Steinbeck, when preparing his adaptation of East of Eden for stage in 1998.

On Sunday 24 March 2019, the company threw a party at the Goodwood Institute to celebrate its 35th anniversary.

Description
 the company was still being run by Rob Croser. Its major benefactor is American playwright and filmmaker John Logan.

The company has strong links to American theatre and culture, but also produces a variety of plays of many genres and types, including classical theatre such as Shakespearean drama.

Venues
In the past, many of IT's productions have been staged at the  Odeon Theatre in Norwood. Other venues have included Theatre 62, the Little Theatre, and, more recently, the Ukaria Cultural Centre.

, most IT plays are performed at the Goodwood Institute, in the suburb of Goodwood, or at Space Theatre at the Adelaide Festival Centre.

Selected productions
The company has staged productions of Hamlet twice - in 1999 and 2016. While the 1999 production featured an actor who was Hamlet's stated age in the play (30 years old), Nick Opolski, the 2016 production featured a much younger cast, with Will Cox playing Prince Hamlet as a teenager. Other Shakespearean plays performed by the company include Macbeth (2021) and Othello (1997, 2011, and 2022).

Jumping for Joy, a dark comedy by American playwright Jon Marans, had its Australian premiere at the Odeon Theatre in Norwood in an Independent Theatre production, directed by Croser, in 2003.

A production of Before the Party, a stage adaptation by Rodney Ackland of Somerset Maugham's short story "Before the Party", was staged in April 2017.

Chekhov's The Seagull was performed at the Little Theatre in early 2022.

Some Australian premiere productions of overseas works include:
John Logan's Never the Sinner (1992, 1994, 2004); Hauptmann (1993); The View from Golgotha (1996); Red (2011; about artist Mark Rothko); Peter and Alice (2014)
Helen Edmundson's Shared Experience production of War and Peace (2000)
Roy Seargent's adaptation of the South African novel Cry the Beloved Country (2006, 2008)
Samuel Adamson's adaptation of All About My Mother (2011)

Achievements and recognition
Independent Theatre was the first non-professional company to be invited to perform in the Space Theatre, and to use the Festival Centre's theatres regularly afterwards.

It was the first company in Adelaide to cast Indian and African Australians in its productions, and the first company in Australia to cast an African actor as Othello, in the form of Shedrick Yarkpai, who is from Liberia.

It has had  stronger links to American theatre and culture than other South Australian theatre companies.

Honours
2012: Rob Croser and David Roach, winners of the inaugural Richard Flynn Award, a lifetime achievement award given as part of the Adelaide Theatre Guide'''s Curtain Call awards, for "Sustained Excellence and Contribution to Theatre in South Australia"
In 2013, Croser and Roach were both awarded Medals of the Order of Australia, for their contribution to the arts through amateur theatre.
In the 2013 Governor's Multicultural Awards, Croser won the Arts and Culture Award "for an outstanding contribution through the arts and culture".

People
Rob Croser
Rob Croser  was born in Maitland, South Australia. He went to school at Scotch College (Adelaide) and studied law at the University of Adelaide, going on to work at the Legal Services Commission of South Australia. In 1981 he started working at the Adelaide Children's (now Youth) Court, representing children in child protection matters. He was responsible for ensuring that every child is represented in such cases, which was later enshrined in law. In 2010, he was awarded the National Children's Law Award for "Outstanding representation of the interests of children".

Before founding IT, Croser directed performances by various amateur companies, including Therry, Adelaide Rep and St Jude's. For four years in the late 1970s, he was resident boarding house English and drama tutor at his old school, Scotch College, and has also directed shows for Pulteney Grammar School and Annesley College. He also taught stagecraft to students of opera at the Elder Conservatorium.

Croser is actively involved with the Anglican Diocese of Adelaide, and, in collaboration with former Archbishop Ian George, presented performances in St Peter's Cathedral.

David Roach
David Roach  is a former priest, and also worked as a counsellor at Daw House, a hospice.

His roles include stage design and as an actor in productions, including as King Duncan in Macbeth (2021)

Actors
Actors who have been cast in IT productions more than once include:
Will Cox joined IT as a 14-year-old in 2007, when he played Jem Finch in To Kill A Mockingbird. In 2008 he was the title character in Huckleberry Finn, for which he won Adelaide Theatre Guide's Curtain Call Best Actor award. Other roles followed in number of productions, including: My Boy Jack (2010); The Magnificent Ambersons (2013); Playboy of the Western World (2013); as Nick Carraway in The Great Gatsby; and as Charles Kean in Red Velvet.
Matt Hyde played Macbeth in Macbeth (2021), and Max in Martin Sherman's play about the persecution of gay love in Nazi Germany, BENT (2022).
Shedrick Yarkpai, from Liberia, was the first African actor to be cast as Othello in an Australian production. He went on to play a variety of other parts in different types of plays, including as Macduff in Macbeth (2021). He has also been the subject of a play about his journey to South Australia as a refugee, called Objects in the Mirror. The play was staged in Chicago in 2017, with Yarkpai played by African American actor Charles Smith, and received a standing ovation. Yarkpai has also appeared on TV and in films, including the 2022 Australian thriller The Stranger'', directed by Thomas M. Wright.

References

External links

Independent Theatre on AusStage

Performing arts in Adelaide
Amateur theatre companies in Australia
Performing groups established in 1983
1903 establishments in Australia